Brian Kelly (born December 27, 1980 in West Chester, Pennsylvania) is a professional lacrosse player. He has previously played for the San Francisco Dragons and the Los Angeles Riptide of Major League Lacrosse (MLL).  He played college lacrosse for the Whittier College Poets in Los Angeles.  Kelly attended high school at Downingtown High School in Downingtown, Pennsylvania, graduating in 1999.

Professional career
Brian Kelly started his professional career in 2003 as a member of the Anaheim Storm of the National Lacrosse League (NLL).  Kelly competed for the Anaheim Storm in each of the franchise's two seasons in the National Lacrosse League (2003-04 & 2004-05). He was drafted by the LA Riptide then after 2 years, Kelly was claimed by the San Francisco Dragons from the league player pool on March 19, 2007.  Kelly made his debut for the Dragons on May 19, 2007 against the Denver Outlaws.  Kelly recently rejoined the LA Riptide for the 2008 season.

Collegiate career
A 2003 Whittier College graduate, Kelly was a two-time All-American and was selected to the North/South All-Star game after serving as captain during Whittier’s 2003 Final Four run.  He was recognized as the nation's top longstick midfielder in both his junior and senior seasons.  Kelly finished his Whittier playing career with over 300 ground balls, as well as contributing over 40 points.

Coaching career
After retiring from professional play, Kelly returned to Whittier College to coach. He started his coaching career as an assistant coach from 2004-2008. During the 2009 season, he was promoted as the Interim Head Coach. After the season ended, he was named head coach of the program.

Kelly stepped down from the program in 2017. Over his nine years he accumulated a record of 60-49 and totaled five winning seasons, which included a berth into the NCAA Division III National Championships in 2016. He is now the director of 3d Southland, the regional designation of 3d Lacrosse covering Orange County and the Greater Los Angeles Area of Southern California.

External links
 lariptide.com Brian Kelly's player bio (dead link as of 2 August 2016)

1980 births
Living people
American lacrosse players
Whittier Poets men's lacrosse players
Major League Lacrosse players
People from West Chester, Pennsylvania
Lacrosse players from Pennsylvania
Sportspeople from Chester County, Pennsylvania
National Lacrosse League players
Anaheim Storm players
Los Angeles Riptide players
Whittier Poets men's lacrosse coaches